Leek (Churnet Valley) railway station is the proposed and future terminus of the Churnet Valley Railway and is currently awaiting construction. It will be the second railway station in Leek.

History

Original station
The original station opened in 1849 by the North Staffordshire Railway on the Churnet Valley Line which connected the towns of Uttoxeter, Leek and Macclesfield. Other lines that the original station connected to were both the Stoke-Leek line which connected Leek to the villages of Endon, Stockton Brook, Fenton Manor and Stoke-On-Trent and the Waterhouses branch line which connected Leek to the villages of Cauldon and Ipstones.

Closure
The lines to and through the station closed in stages with passenger services being the first to be withdrawn on the Waterhouses Branch in 1935, followed by the Stoke-Leek Line in 1956 and finally the Churnet Valley Line closed in stages with the section from Leek-North Rode closing in 1960 and the section from Leek-Uttoxeter closing in 1965.

Freight continued to North Rode until 1964 when the entire line closed from North Rode to Leek and Leek was closed to freight and through traffic in July 1970.

Freight from Stoke-on-Trent continued to serve the sand sidings at Oakamoor as well as the Waterhouses Branch to the quarries at Cauldon until 1988 when the lines were mothballed.

Preservation and reopening of the Churnet Valley Line

Plans were first mooted to re-open Leek as a heritage railway as far back as 1970 when services were first curtailed, but following the Council's short notice demolition of Leek station and the threat to Cheddleton in 1973, these plans were shelved and efforts concentrated on Cheddleton. The remaining Churnet Valley Line from Oakamoor Sidings to Leek Brook Junction was mothballed in 1988, and taken over by the Churnet Valley Railway in 1996. It has always been stated that the long term aim was to restore services to Leek eventually.

Original Reconnect Leek Project
First announced in 2015, an article on the news website StokeSentinel.co.uk. announced efforts by Moorlands & City Railways to reconnect Leek back to the mainline with the article quoted as saying:

Because the former station in Leek is now the site of a Morrisons supermarket, a new station was proposed as outlined in the Staffordshire Moorlands District Council's Masterplan for developing tourism in the area. This includes the proposed redevelopment of the Cornhill area with a new canal marina and railway station planned.

With MCR's planned western extension to Stoke, this new station would have provided an interchange for CVR services, via the Stoke–Leek line, to the national network.

With regards to the actual extension, the project was set up under the title "Reconnect Leek" and the main items of this was:

 Planning request made for 89 new houses at Leek Brook on current brownfield site inside the former triangle
 Once granted, this land will then be sold to raise funds for the extension of the railway into Leek
 New station at Leek
 Re-instatement of the North-East Curve
 New station at Leek Brook to provide connection for the new houses

CVR Reconnect Leek Project
Since then, CVR have taken on the Leek project themselves, and after much dialogue with the council received outline planning permission for their own proposal in May 2018. They then launched their own project publicly on 1 February 2020.

Currently, the only scheme that has been completed by both CVR and M&CRL is the partial reopening of the Waterhouses Branch Line which has reopened from Leek Brook to near the former site of Bradnop but both companies are still awaiting permission to purchase the site to reopen for heritage use.

They hope to eventually reopen the line to Caldon Low and eventually Waterhouses station site to link the line with the popular Manifold Way.

There is also an aspiration to reopen the line from Leek Brook to Stoke-on-Trent but to also share the line as a heritage, commuter and freight line which would mean that Leek would get a commuter service, the CVR can run services to Stoke-on-Trent on certain dates and freight traffic can serve the quarries at Ipstones and Caldon Low once again. The CVR plan to run services to Endon on select dates and the hope is to reopen the stations at Wall Grange, Stockton Brook, Endon, Milton, Bucknall and Northwood and Fenton Manor to give Leek a mainline connection once again via Stoke and to also allow freight to utilize the line to the quarries at Cauldon.

There are also aspirations to reach Oakamoor and eventually Alton Towers as a shared heritage and visitor railway.

Any expansions to Denstone. Rocester, and Uttoxeter would be unlikely to happen unless a viable solution is found as the trackbed remains clear as far as the former Denstone platforms but the trackbed towards Rocester has been blocked by a house which sits on the other side of the former level crossing. The trackbed is still partially unblocked or built on until the former Rocester station site which is now occupied by the JCB and the trackbed towards Uttoxeter now forms both roads and has been built on or returned to agricultural use.

Any expansions towards Rudyard, Rushton Spencer and Macclesfield is impossible unless a viable solution is found due to the trackbed towards Rudyard being built on by both housing and road alignments.

References

Buildings and structures in Leek
Heritage railway stations in Staffordshire
Proposed railway stations in England